This is a list of episodes of Super-Vocal Season 1 in 2018 to early 2019. Super-Vocal was broadcast on Hunan TV from November 2, 2018 to January 18, 2019.

Format 
From episodes 1-7, the six best performances (solo, duets, or trios) are chosen after being judged by the three show producers, and are given the Principal recommendation. Six other performances are chosen as Understudy recommendations, and attempt to defeat the Principal performances. The ending Principal performances go on to be the Principal performances of the next week. Starting in episode 8, the members divide into six groups of six members, led by members who have been Principal performers the most. The final round culminates in six winners, that were able to go on to perform on Singer 2019, as a Challenger Singer. The winning Principal members of this season were Ayanga, Zheng Yunlong, Cai Chengyu, Gao Tianhe, Wang Kai, and Tong Zhuo.

Singers

Episodes

References

2018 Chinese television series debuts